Wenyen Gabriel (born March 26, 1997) is a South Sudanese-American professional basketball player for the Los Angeles Lakers of the National Basketball Association (NBA). He played college basketball for the Kentucky Wildcats, after being a 5-star prospect in 2016, ranked as high as #14 on ESPN's Top 100. Gabriel has also played in the NBA for the Sacramento Kings, Portland Trail Blazers, New Orleans Pelicans, Brooklyn Nets, and Los Angeles Clippers.

High school career

Gabriel attended Wilbraham & Monson Academy in Wilbraham, Massachusetts since 2014. Prior to that, he played at Trinity High School in Manchester, New Hampshire for three years. As a senior in 2015-16, he averaged 22.0 points per game, 14.0 rebounds per game, 7.0 blocks per game and 6.3 assists per game. In October 2015, he announced his decision to enroll at the University of Kentucky. Maryland, Duke, UConn and Providence were other schools on his shortlist. He played 19:17 minutes in the 2016 Nike Hoop Summit, scoring two points, grabbing four rebounds and dishing out two assists. He also played in the 2016 Jordan Brand Classic. Gabriel was rated as a five-star recruit and ranked #14 in the Class of 2016 by ESPN.

College career
He made his debut for the Kentucky Wildcats in an exhibition game on October 31, 2016 against Clarion University, tallying nine points, two rebounds and one assist in 17 minutes coming off the bench. As a freshman, he played in 38 games, including 23 starts, averaging 4.6 points and 4.8 rebounds in 17.8 minutes. During his sophomore year, Gabriel became more of a key figure for Kentucky's success that season, tallying 6.8 points and 5.4 rebounds in 37 games. He led Kentucky with 40 blocked shots.

Professional career

Sacramento Kings (2018–2020)
Gabriel declared for the 2018 NBA draft, but went undrafted. He joined the Sacramento Kings for the 2018 NBA Summer League. On July 31, 2018, he signed a two-way contract with the Kings. However, he did not appear in a game during that season.

Just prior to the start of the 2019–20 season, the Kings converted Gabriel’s contract to a standard deal. He had a double-double of 16 points and 16 rebounds for the Stockton Kings on December 20, 2019, in a win over the Delaware Blue Coats. On January 11, 2020, Gabriel had 37 points, 11 rebounds and three assists for Stockton in its 163–143 win over the Iowa Wolves.

Portland Trail Blazers (2020)
On January 20, 2020, Gabriel was traded to the Portland Trail Blazers along with Trevor Ariza and Caleb Swanigan in exchange for Kent Bazemore, Anthony Tolliver and two future second round picks. He made his debut for the Trail Blazers on January 31, going 0-for-3 from the field with one rebound, one assist and a block in 13 minutes as the Blazers defeated the Los Angeles Lakers 127–119.

New Orleans Pelicans (2020–2021)
On November 30, 2020, Gabriel signed with the New Orleans Pelicans. He was waived just prior to the start of the 2021–22 season.

Wisconsin Herd (2021)
In October 2021, Gabriel joined the Wisconsin Herd as an affiliate player. In 12 games he averaged 13.8 points on 47.5 percent shooting from the field and 38.7 percent shooting from 3-point range, 8.6 rebounds, 1.0 assists, 1.1 steals and 2.0 blocks in 25.8 minutes per contest.

Brooklyn Nets (2021)
On December 21, 2021, Gabriel signed a 10-day contract with the Brooklyn Nets.

Los Angeles Clippers (2021–2022)
On December 31, 2021, Gabriel signed a 10-day contract with the Los Angeles Clippers. He signed a third 10-day contract with the Clippers on January 11, 2022.

Return to Wisconsin (2022)
Following the expiration of his second 10-day contract, Gabriel was re-acquired by the Wisconsin Herd on January 21.

On January 29, 2022, Gabriel signed a 10-day contract with the New Orleans Pelicans. He did not play in a game for the Pelicans before his deal expired. On February 8, he was reacquired by the Herd.

Los Angeles Lakers (2022–present)
On March 1, 2022, Gabriel signed a two-way contract with the Los Angeles Lakers. On April 8, 2022, the Los Angeles Lakers converted Gabriel's two-way contract into a standard contract for the rest of the season.

Career statistics

NBA

Regular season

|-
| style="text-align:left;"|
| style="text-align:left;"|Sacramento
| 11 || 0 || 5.5 || .353 || .125 || .600 || .9 || .3 || .3 || .2 || 1.7
|-
| style="text-align:left;"|
| style="text-align:left;"|Portland
| 19 || 1 || 9.2 || .484 || .417 || .750 || 2.2 || .3 || .4 || .3 || 2.7
|-
| style="text-align:left;"|
| style="text-align:left;"|New Orleans
| 21 || 0 || 11.5 || .400 || .406 || .647 || 2.6 || .5 || .4 || .4 || 3.4
|-
| style="text-align:left;"|
| style="text-align:left;"|Brooklyn
| 1 || 0 || 1.0 || – || – || – || 1.0 || .0 || .0 || .0 || .0
|-
| style="text-align:left;"|
| style="text-align:left;"|L.A. Clippers
| 6 || 0 || 7.7 || .385 || .400 || .500 || 2.3 || .3 || .2 || .3 || 2.3
|-
| style="text-align:left;"|
| style="text-align:left;"|L.A. Lakers
| 19 || 5 || 16.4 || .505 || .261 || .605 || 4.3 || .6 || .2 || .5 || 6.7
|- class="sortbottom"
| style="text-align:center;" colspan="2"|Career
| 77 || 6 || 10.8 || .454 || .338 || .630 || 2.6 || .4 || .4 || .3 || 2.6

Playoffs

|-
| style="text-align:left;"|2020
| style="text-align:left;"|Portland
| 4 || 2 || 13.3 || .600 || .400 || .500 || 2.5 || 1.0 || .5 || .5 || 5.3
|- class="sortbottom"
| style="text-align:center;" colspan="2"|Career
| 4 || 2 || 13.3 || .600 || .400 || .500 || 2.5 || 1.0 || .5 || .5 || 5.3

Personal life
Gabriel was born in Khartoum, Sudan, on March 26, 1997. Because his sister – born a year earlier – had died in infancy, Gabriel was given the name "Wenyen", which means "wipe your tears" in his native Dinka language. Two weeks after he was born, Gabriel's mother, Rebecca Gak, moved with him and his three siblings to Cairo, Egypt to escape the violence of the Second Sudanese Civil War. While Gabriel's mother worked to earn enough money to move his father, Makuac, to Cairo, his seven-year-old brother, Komot, became Gabriel's primary care giver. Two years after moving to Egypt, the United Nations granted an appeal to move the refugee family to Manchester, New Hampshire, an American city with a large South Sudanese population.

Gabriel received a US passport in 2015 and represented the USA Basketball Junior National Select Team at the 2016 Nike Hoop Summit. He considers South Sudan his rightful home country.

References

External links

 
 Kentucky Wildcats bio

1997 births
Living people
American people of South Sudanese descent
American people of Sudanese descent
American sportspeople of African descent
Basketball players from New Hampshire
Brooklyn Nets players
Dinka people
Kentucky Wildcats men's basketball players
Los Angeles Clippers players
Los Angeles Lakers players
New Orleans Pelicans players
People from Khartoum
Portland Trail Blazers players
Power forwards (basketball)
Sacramento Kings players
South Sudanese men's basketball players
Sportspeople from Manchester, New Hampshire
Sportspeople of South Sudanese descent
Stockton Kings players
Undrafted National Basketball Association players
Wisconsin Herd players